Lutheran viewpoints concerning homosexuality are diverse because there is no one worldwide body which represents all Lutherans. The Lutheran World Federation, a worldwide 'communion of churches' and the largest global body of Lutherans, contains member churches on both sides of the issue. However, other Lutherans, including the Confessional Evangelical Lutheran Conference and International Lutheran Council, completely reject homosexuality.

Luther's view
Martin Luther, who had spent time in Rome, claimed that Pope Leo X had vetoed a measure that cardinals should restrict the number of boys they kept for their pleasure, "otherwise it would have been spread throughout the world how openly and shamelessly the pope and the cardinals in Rome practice sodomy" and encouraged Germans not to spend time fighting fellow countrymen in defense of the papacy.

Luther also noted:
I for my part do not enjoy dealing with this passage [Genesis 19:4-5], because so far the ears of the Germans are innocent of and uncontaminated by this monstrous depravity; for even though disgrace, like other sins, has crept in through an ungodly soldier and a lewd merchant, still the rest of the people are unaware of what is being done in secret. The Carthusian monks deserve to be hated because they were the first to bring this terrible pollution into Germany from the monasteries of Italy.

Synods allowing homosexual relationships

In North America
In 1970, Strommen, et al. surveyed 4,745 Lutheran adults between the ages of 15 and 65. They were members of the American Lutheran Church, Lutheran Church in America, and Lutheran Church–Missouri Synod. 1% stated that they frequently had homosexual intercourse during the past year and 3% stated that they did so occasionally. 90% said that they never had homosexual intercourse during the past year, and 7% did not respond.

Evangelical Lutheran Church in America 

The Evangelical Lutheran Church in America, the largest Lutheran church body in the United States, allows for LGBTQ+ marriage and ordination of LGBTQ+ clergy. ELCA policy states that LGBTQ+ individuals are welcome and encouraged to become members and to participate in the life of the congregation. The ELCA has provided supplemental resources for the rite of marriage in Evangelical Lutheran Worship which use inclusive language and are suitable for use in LGBTQ+ marriage ceremonies. The group ReconcilingWorks supports the full inclusion of LGBTQ+ members in Lutheran churches in the ELCA, and provides resources to assist ELCA congregations in becoming more welcoming communities for LGBTQ+ persons. ReconcilingWorks recognizes ELCA congregations that have committed to embracing LGBTQ+ persons as Reconciling in Christ congregations.

The current policy on LGBTQ+ inclusion in the ELCA developed over a period of several years.

In 2001, a Social Statement on Sexuality was requested by the Churchwide Assembly and entrusted to a Task Force. In light of the ongoing work of that task force, the 2007 Churchwide Assembly passed a resolution asking bishops to exercise restraint in discipline of those congregations and pastors in violation of 'Vision and Expectations.'

Prior to August 2009, the ELCA expected "ordained ministers who are homosexual in their self-understanding" to "abstain from homosexual sexual relationships".

The 2009 ELCA Churchwide Assembly in Minneapolis passed "Human Sexuality, Gift and Trust", which approved more positive assessments of same-gender partnerships in the church. On 21 August 2009, the same body passed four ministry policy resolutions that opened the way for congregations to recognize and support such partnerships and for those in committed same-gender partnerships to be rostered leaders within the ELCA. A separate motion at the same assembly recommended that a rite of blessing for same-sex unions be provided.

In 2013, Guy Erwin, who has lived in a gay partnership for 19 years, was installed in California as Bishop of the ELCA's Southwest California Synod, becoming the first openly gay person to serve as a Bishop in the ELCA.

Evangelical Lutheran Church in Canada 
In July 2011 Churchwide Assembly of Evangelical Lutheran Church in Canada passed a new sexuality statement, permitting clergy in committed same-gender partnerships and allowing the blessing of same-sex unions.

In Europe 
In many European Lutheran churches, open LGBT people can work as Lutheran pastors. In the United Kingdom, the Lutheran Church in Great Britain allows the ordination of LGBT people and permits same-sex marriage.

EKD in Germany 

In the year 2000, the Evangelical Church in Germany (EKD) passed  the resolution Verantwortung und Verlässlichkeit stärken, in which same-gender partnerships are supported. In November 2010, EKD passed a new right for LGBT ordination of homosexual ministers, who live in civil unions.
All churches within the EKD allowed blessing of same-sex marriages.
Evangelical Church in Baden (Evangelische Landeskirche in Baden), a united church body in Baden
Evangelical Church Berlin-Brandenburg-Silesian Upper Lusatia (Evangelische Kirche in Berlin-Brandenburg-schlesische Oberlausitz), a united church body in Berlin-Brandenburg-Silesian Upper Lusatia merged in 2004 from:
 Evangelische Kirche in Berlin-Brandenburg
 Evangelische Kirche der schlesischen Oberlausitz
Evangelical Church of Bremen (Bremische Evangelische Kirche), a united church body in Bremen
Protestant Lutheran State Church of Brunswick (Evangelisch-Lutherische Landeskirche in Braunschweig), a Lutheran church body in Brunswick
Evangelical-Lutheran Church of Hanover (Evangelisch-Lutherische Landeskirche Hannovers), a Lutheran church body in the former Province of Hanover
Protestant Church in Hesse and Nassau (Evangelische Kirche in Hessen und Nassau), a united church body in the former People's State of Hesse and Nassau
Evangelical Church of Hesse Electorate-Waldeck (Evangelische Kirche von Kurhessen-Waldeck), a united church body in former Hesse-Cassel and Waldeck
Church of Lippe (Lippische Landeskirche), a Reformed church body of Lippe
Evangelical Church in Central Germany (Evangelische Kirche in Mitteldeutschland), a united church body that was created in 2009 from the merger of:
 Evangelical Church of the Church Province of Saxony (Evangelische Kirche der Kirchenprovinz Sachsen) (Province of Saxony)
 Evangelical-Lutheran Church in Thuringia (Evangelisch-Lutherische Kirche in Thüringen) (Thuringia)
Evangelical Lutheran Church in Northern Germany (Evangelisch-Lutherische Kirche in Norddeutschland) a Lutheran church body that was created in 2012 from the merger of:
North Elbian Evangelical Lutheran Church (Nordelbische Evangelisch-Lutherische Kirche), a Lutheran church body in Northern Germany
Evangelical Lutheran Church of Mecklenburg (Evangelisch-Lutherische Landeskirche Mecklenburgs), a Lutheran church body in Mecklenburg
Pomeranian Evangelical Church (Pommersche Evangelische Kirche), a united church body in Pomerania
Evangelical Lutheran Church in Oldenburg (Evangelisch-Lutherische Kirche in Oldenburg), a Lutheran church body in Oldenburg
Evangelical Church of the Palatinate (Evangelische Kirche der Pfalz) or Protestantische Landeskirche, a united church body in Palatinate
Evangelical Church in the Rhineland (Evangelische Kirche im Rheinland), a united church body in the Rhineland
Evangelical-Lutheran Church of Saxony (Evangelisch-Lutherische Landeskirche Sachsens), a Lutheran church body in Saxony
Evangelical Church of Westphalia (Evangelische Kirche von Westfalen), a united church body in Westphalia
Evangelical Reformed Church (Regional Church) Evangelisch-reformierte Kirche (Landeskirche), a Reformed church body, covering the territories of No. 3, 5, 7, 12, 16, 17, and 19 
Evangelical Lutheran Church in Bavaria (Evangelische-Lutherische Landeskirche in Bayern), a Lutheran church body in Bavaria
Evangelical-Lutheran Church in Württemberg, a Lutheran church body in Württemberg
Evangelical Lutheran Church of Schaumburg-Lippe, a Lutheran church body in Lower Saxony
Evangelical Church of Anhalt, a United church body in Saxony-Anhalt

Nordic countries 
The Church of Iceland allows same-sex marriage.
The Church of Sweden has permitted the blessing of same-sex unions and the ordination of partnered gays and lesbians since 2006. Starting in November 2009, the church officiates same-sex marriage, after the Riksdag allowed same-sex marriage starting 1 May 2009 – however, individual priests can choose not to perform marriages for couples of the same gender. The Church of Denmark also provides for such blessings, as does the Church of Norway, which also ordains gays and lesbians.

The Evangelical Lutheran Church of Finland is the largest Lutheran church in Europe that does not permit blessing of same-sex unions – despite ongoing controversy. As of October 2010 the Church of Finland allows priests to pray for same-sex couples: For registered partnerships, the church says that "the [same-sex] couple may organise prayers with a priest or other church workers and invited guests". Additionally, Archbishop Kari Mäkinen expressed his support for the new law permitting same-gender marriages. In 2016, although the bishops in Finland did not agree to perform same-sex marriages, "bishops have taken the position that it is possible to hold prayer services to bless same-sex couples". Tens of thousands of Finns have resigned from the church during the 2010s due to comments made by church officials either supporting or condemning same sex marriages and relations. in 2018 59 members of church's synod voted against homosexual marriage and 49 supported it.

South America

Argentina and Uruguay 
The Evangelical Church of the River Plate, which includes Lutherans and Waldensians, and the United Lutheran Church have supported civil unions and same-sex marriages.

Evangelical Church of the Lutheran Confession in Brazil 
In 2011, the church released a pastoral letter accepting the Supreme Court's decision to allow same-sex marriage in Brazil, and supported the families of same-sex couples.

Denominations against homosexual activity

In North America 
 The Lutheran Church–Missouri Synod
 The Lutheran Church-Canada 
 The Wisconsin Evangelical Lutheran Synod 
The Association of Free Lutheran Congregations
 The Evangelical Lutheran Synod 
 The North American Lutheran Church
 Lutheran Congregations in Mission for Christ
 Church of the Lutheran Brethren of America
 Church of the Lutheran Confession

In Europe 
 The Silesian Evangelical Church of the Augsburg Confession condemns homosexual behavior as sin.
 The Evangelical Lutheran Free Church (Germany) views homosexuality as hurting the natural order.
 The Independent Evangelical-Lutheran Church, Germany
 The Evangelical Lutheran Church of England (ELCE)
 The Evangelical Lutheran Church in Lithuania
 The Evangelical Church of the Augsburg Confession in Poland
 The Evangelical Lutheran Church of Latvia

In South America 
 Argentinian Evangelical Lutheran Church
 Evangelical Lutheran Church of Brazil
 Confessional Lutheran Church of Chile

See also

Homosexuality and Christianity
2009 ELCA Churchwide Assembly

References

Bibliography

 
Lutheran theology